ICFAI University, Raipur is a private university located in Raipur, Chhattisgarh, India. Established under Section 9(2) of the Chhattisgarh Private Universities (Establishment and Operations) Act 2005 and notified on 25 March 2011. The University has been empowered to award degrees by the University Grants Commission, under Section 22 of the UGC Act, 1956.
It is one of eleven universities established by The ICFAI Group.
The University is a member of the Association of Indian Universities (AIU) New Delhi.

Faculties
ICFAI University consists of five faculties :
Faculty of Management Studies
Faculty of Science & Technology
Faculty of Education
Faculty of Commerce
Faculty of Arts & Humanities

References

Universities in Chhattisgarh
Private universities in India
Education in Raipur, Chhattisgarh
Educational institutions established in 2011
2011 establishments in Chhattisgarh